David David-Weill (1871–1952) was a French-American banker, chairman of Lazard Frères in Paris, who built an important collection of art.  His collection was plundered by the Nazis during the Second World War and over 2000 items seized. He was a major donor to French and American museums and galleries and a benefactor to universities.

Early life and family
David-Weill was born in San Francisco on 30 August 1871. He was the son of Julie (née Cahn) and :fr:Alexandre Weill (banquier) (1834-1906). His father was a cousin to the three French Jewish brothers who founded Lazard Frères & Co. His parents had left France in 1870 because of the Franco-Prussian War and settled in California, where Raphaël Weill (1837-1920) 
, a brother of Alexandre Weill lived. They returned to France about 1883. David-Weill continued his education there at the Lycée Condorcet and the École Libre des Sciences Politiques. He married Flora Raphaël in 1897 and they had seven children, including Pierre David-Weill and Jean David-Weill.

Banking career
Following his education, David-Weill performed his military service and began to work at Lazard Frères, where he rose to become chairman. He became a regent of the Banque de France in 1935.

Collecting
David-Weill began to collect from an early age. His acquisitions included paintings, drawings, miniatures, sculptures, furniture, silverware, and other items. He became president of the Réunion des Musées Nationaux and vice president of the Société des amis du Louvre.

In 1931, David-Weill transferred part of his collection to a British holding company called Anglo-Continental Art, Inc, which was owned by a Canadian corporation that he controlled.

In late 1940, David-Weill sent twenty-six cases of paintings and antiquities to Lisbon for shipment on the SS Excalibur to New York, where they were to be sold by the Wildensteins, as property of Anglo-Continental Art, Inc. However U.S. Treasury officials, concerned about their French origins in wartime, "descended on the elegant premises of Wildenstein, New York". The assets of Anglo-Continental were frozen by US officials and proceeds placed in a blocked account.

In France, David-Weill's collection was looted by the Nazis during the Second World War and, according to German records, 2687 items seized.

In later life he donated more than 2000 items to museums and galleries, including the Guimet Museum, the Louvre, and universities in New York, Hamburg, Leiden, Honolulu, and Stockholm. He donated to the libraries of the Musée de l'Homme and the Institut national d'histoire de l'art, to which he gave the manuscript and journal of Eugène Delacroix. He also gave his Chinese-bronze collection to the Musée Guimet and his  cloisonné objects to the Musée des Arts Décoratifs (MAD).

Death
David-Weill died in Neuilly-sur-Seine, Paris, on 7 July 1952. Parts of his collection were sold in a series of auctions in 1970.

Honors

David-Weill was elected to the Académie des beaux-arts in 1934.
Avenue David-Weill in the 14th arrondissement of Paris was named in his honor in 1960 in tribute to his involvement with the Cité internationale universitaire de Paris.

See also
Michel David-Weill

References

Further reading
Henriot, Gabriel. (1926) Collection David-Weill. Paris: Presses de Braun. (3 vols.)

External links

https://web.archive.org/web/20131030025533/http://www.genea-bdf.org/BasesDonnees/genealogies/weill.htm
http://www.frick.org/interact/video/fora/david-weill_family
http://www.ciup.fr/bio-saison-1/david-david-weill-43536/
https://web.archive.org/web/20150210041800/http://lesassos.com/sn/article.php?article_id=499
http://www1.alliancefr.com/culture/le-role-du-banquier-david-david-weill-dans-lart-5018242

1871 births
American art collectors
1952 deaths
People from San Francisco
Jewish art collectors
Jewish American bankers
Subjects of Nazi art appropriations
Lazard family